Isorhapontigenin is a tetrahydroxylated stilbenoid with a methoxy group. It is an isomer of rhapontigenin and an analog of resveratrol. It is found in the Chinese herb Gnetum cleistostachyum, in Gnetum parvifolium and in the seeds of the palm Aiphanes aculeata.

An isorhapontigenin tetramer, gnetuhainin R, can be isolated from the lianas of Gnetum hainanense.

Isorhapontin, the isorhapontigenin glucoside, can be found in spruce species such as the Norway spruce (Picea abies), the sitka spruce (Picea sitchensis) and the white spruce (Picea glauca).

References 

Stilbenoids